Pierre-Joseph Pelletier (22 March 1788 – 19 July 1842) was a French chemist and pharmacist who did notable research on vegetable alkaloids, and was the co-discoverer with Joseph Bienaimé Caventou of quinine, caffeine, and strychnine. He was also a collaborator and co-author with Polish chemist Filip Walter.

See also
 Joseph Bienaimé Caventou
 Filip Nariusz Walter

References

Further reading 

 

Scientists from Paris
1788 births
1842 deaths
 French Roman Catholics
19th-century French chemists
French biochemists
Members of the French Academy of Sciences